Third Baptist Church may refer to:

Third Baptist Church (San Francisco, California), CHL and SFDL-listed
Third Baptist Church (St. Louis, Missouri)
Third Baptist Church (Nashville, Tennessee), NRHP-listed
Third Baptist Church (Washington, D.C.), NRHP-listed

See also
First Baptist Church (disambiguation)
Second Baptist Church (disambiguation)